Giancarlo Cadé (27 February 1930 – 7 October 2013) was an Italian professional football player and coach, who played as a midfielder.

Club career
Born in Zanica, Cadé played for 6 seasons (64 games, no goals) in the Serie A for Atalanta B.C.

International career
Cadé played his only game for the Italy national football team on 16 July 1952 at the 1952 Summer Olympics, against the United States.

Managing career
Among the more notable stages of Cadé's career as a manager were his times with A.C. Reggiana 1919 (his first managerial experience, promotion to Serie B), A.C. Mantova (promotion to Serie A, 9th and 16th place in the Serie A and relegation back to Serie B), second stint with Hellas Verona F.C. (10th in Serie A), A.C. Torino (7th and 8th in Serie A), A.S. Varese 1910 (relegation from Serie A), third stint with Hellas Verona F.C. (10th and 13th in Serie A), Delfino Pescara 1936 (promotion to Serie A), Bologna F.C. 1909 (promotion to Serie B) and A.C. Ancona (promotion to Serie B).

Personal life
Giancarlo Cadé's younger brother Giuseppe Cadé played football professionally as well. To distinguish them, Giancarlo was referred to as Cadé I and Giuseppe as Cadé II.

Death
Cadé died, aged 83, in Zanica on 7 October 2013.

References

External links
 

1930 births
2013 deaths
Italian footballers
Italy international footballers
Serie A players
Serie B players
Serie C players
Olympic footballers of Italy
Footballers at the 1952 Summer Olympics
Atalanta B.C. players
Catania S.S.D. players
Cagliari Calcio players
Reggina 1914 players
Mantova 1911 players
Italian football managers
Serie A managers
A.C. Reggiana 1919 managers
Hellas Verona F.C. managers
Mantova 1911 managers
Torino F.C. managers
Atalanta B.C. managers
Delfino Pescara 1936 managers
A.C. Cesena managers
Palermo F.C. managers
L.R. Vicenza managers
Bologna F.C. 1909 managers
A.C. Ancona managers
Ravenna F.C. managers
Virtus Bergamo Alzano Seriate 1909 managers
Association football midfielders